Ciorăști is a commune located in Vrancea County, Romania. It is composed of seven villages: Ciorăști, Codrești, Mihălceni, Salcia Nouă, Salcia Veche, Satu Nou, and Spătăreasa.

Natives
Ioan Dumitrache (1889–1977), a major general during World War II, in command of the 2nd Mountain Division.

References

Communes in Vrancea County
Localities in Muntenia